is a Japanese actor represented by JFCT.

Filmography

TV series

Films

References

External links
 
 

Japanese male actors
1971 births
Living people
People from Sōka